The 2012–13 Brescia Calcio season is the 84th season in club history.

Review and events

Matches

Legend

Friendlies

Serie B

Promotion Playoffs

Livorno advanced due to better placing on ladder

Coppa Italia

Sources

Brescia Calcio
Brescia Calcio seasons